Craig Newsome (born August 10, 1971) is an American former professional football cornerback in the National Football League (NFL). He was selected in the first round of the 1995 NFL Draft by the Green Bay Packers, where he played for four years. He won Super Bowl XXXI with the Packers, beating the New England Patriots. He was later traded to the San Francisco 49ers in 1999.

Amateur career
He played for Eisenhower High School in Rialto, CA, the same high school as Ronnie Lott, and attended San Bernardino Valley College and later transferred to Arizona State University.

NFL career

The Packers drafted Newsome with the 32nd pick in the 1995 NFL Draft. He was the starting cornerback on the 1996 Green Bay Packers championship team. He also had a forced fumble and an interception in Super Bowl XXXI.  On September 19, 1999 the Packers traded Newsome to the 49ers.

Post NFL career
Newsome coached the La Crosse River Rats of the Indoor Football League in 2000, located in La Crosse Wisconsin. He currently resides in Holmen, Wisconsin where he is a coach on the Holmen High School football team.

References

External links
 http://holmenyouthtacklefootball.org/

1971 births
Living people
American football cornerbacks
Arizona State Sun Devils football players
Green Bay Packers players
San Francisco 49ers players
San Bernardino Valley College alumni
Ed Block Courage Award recipients